Baimaqiao Subdistrict is a subdistrict in Ningxiang City, Hunan Province, China.

Administrative division
The subdistrict is divided into three villages and two communities: Fengxingshan Community, Zhengnong Community, Bailong Village, Baima Village, and Renfu Village.

Geography
The Wuzhi Reservoir is located in the subdistrict and discharges into the Wei River.
Wei River, known as "Mother River" and a tributary of the Xiang River,  flows through the subdistrict.

Transport
The Provincial Highway S209 passes through the subdistrict.

Culture
Huaguxi is the most influence form of local theater.

References

External links

Subdistricts of Ningxiang